Air Marshal Balabhadra Radha Krishna, PVSM, AVSM, SC is an officer in the Indian Air Force. He is former Air Officer Commanding-in-Chief (AOC-in-C), Western Air Command. He took over the office on 1 July 2021, following the elevation of Air Marshal Vivek Ram Chaudhari. He is Chief of Integrated Defence Staff (the Vice Chief of Defence Staff) on 30 September 2021. Previously, he served as the Director General Air (Operations) and prior to that he served as Senior Air Staff Officer of South Western Air Command.

Early life and education 
BR Krishna is an alumnus of National Defence Academy, Defence Services Staff College, Wellington and National Defence College.

Career
BR Krishna was commissioned as a fighter pilot in the Indian Air Force on December 22, 1983. He has flying experience of nearly 5000 hours on a variety of fighter aircraft including operational, instructional and test flying. He is a qualified flying instructor and a test pilot.

With a long career of 38 years, he has commanded a front-line fighter aircraft squadron, and has commanded the Airforce Test Pilot School. He was the Commandant at the Aircraft and Systems Testing Establishment (ASTE). As Air Marshal, he served as the Senior Air Staff Officer of South Western Air Command and prior to his elevation as AOC-in-C, he served as the Director General Air (Operations). As Chief of the IDS, he merged the old Amar Jawan Jyoti at India Gate with the new one at the National War Memorial on 21 January 2022.

Awards and decorations
During his career, BR Krishna for his gallant act in the air, he was awarded Shaurya Chakra in 1986 and for the distinguished service, he was awarded Ati Vishisht Seva Medal in 2017 and the Param Vishisht Seva Medal in 2022.

References 

Indian Air Force air marshals
Recipients of the Ati Vishisht Seva Medal
Recipients of the Shaurya Chakra
Year of birth missing (living people)
Living people
Recipients of the Param Vishisht Seva Medal
National Defence College, India alumni
National Defence Academy (India) alumni
Defence Services Staff College alumni